Sylvia H. Rambo (born April 17, 1936) is a senior United States district judge of the United States District Court for the Middle District of Pennsylvania.

Education and career

Born in Royersford, Pennsylvania, Rambo received a Bachelor of Arts degree from Dickinson College in 1958 and a Juris Doctor from Dickinson School of Law (now Pennsylvania State University - Dickinson Law) in 1962. She began her legal career as an attorney for the Trust Department of the Bank of Delaware in Wilmington, Delaware from 1962 to 1963. From 1963 to 1976 Rambo maintained a private practice in Carlisle, Pennsylvania. In conjunction with her private practice, she served as a public defender for Cumberland County, Pennsylvania from 1973 to 1976, and as chief public defender in 1976. She was an adjunct faculty member at the Dickinson School of Law from 1975 to 1977. In 1976, Rambo was appointed to serve on the Pennsylvania Court of Common Pleas for Cumberland County, and thus became the first female judge to serve on that bench. After her term expired in 1978, she returned to private practice in Carlisle until 1979.

Federal judicial service

On May 29, 1979, Rambo was nominated by President Jimmy Carter to a new seat on the United States District Court for the Middle District of Pennsylvania created by 92 Stat. 1629. She was confirmed by the United States Senate on July 23, 1979, and received her commission on July 24, 1979. She served as Chief Judge from 1992 to 1999, and assumed senior status on April 18, 2001. Both her commission on the bench and tenure as chief judge in the Middle District were firsts for women. On June 28, 2022, the United States Courthouse in Harrisburg, Pennsylvania, was named in her honor.

See also
List of first women lawyers and judges in Pennsylvania

References

Sources
 

1936 births
Living people
Dickinson College alumni
Dickinson School of Law alumni
Judges of the United States District Court for the Middle District of Pennsylvania
Public defenders
United States district court judges appointed by Jimmy Carter
20th-century American judges
Dickinson School of Law faculty
American women legal scholars
21st-century American judges
20th-century American women judges
21st-century American women judges